Helmand, also known as Hillmand, in ancient times, as Hermand and Hethumand, is one of the 34 provinces of Afghanistan, in the south of the country. It is the largest province by area, covering  area. The province contains 13 districts, encompassing over 1,000 villages, and roughly 1,446,230 settled people. Lashkargah serves as the provincial capital. Helmand was part of the Greater Kandahar region until made into a separate province by the Afghan government in the 20th century.

The Helmand River flows through the mainly desert region of the province, providing water used for irrigation. The Kajaki Dam, which is one of Afghanistan's major reservoirs, is located in the Kajaki district. Helmand is believed to be one of the world's largest opium producing regions, responsible for around 42% of the world's total production. This is believed to be more than the whole of Myanmar, which is the second-largest producing nation after Afghanistan. The region also produces tobacco, sugar beets, cotton, sesame, wheat, mung beans, maize, nuts, sunflowers, onions, potato, tomato, cauliflower, peanut, apricot, grape, and melon. The province has a domestic airport (Bost Airport), in the city of Lashkargah that was heavily used by NATO-led forces. The former British Camp Bastion and the U.S. Camp Leatherneck is a short distance southwest of Lashkargah.

Throughout the 2001-2021 war in Afghanistan, Helmand was a hotbed of insurgent activities and was often considered at the time to be Afghanistan's "most dangerous" province. The province also witnessed some of the heaviest fighting during the war, where at its peak hundreds of civilians were being killed monthly. Its suitable climate for the cultivation of a wide range of crops also contributed greatly to the Taliban's finances. Additionally, Helmand is considered to be one of Afghanistan's most socially conservative areas.

History

Helmand culture
Helmand culture of western Afghanistan was a Bronze Age culture of the 3rd millennium BC. It is exemplified by such major sites as Shahr-i Sokhta, Mundigak, and Bampur.

The term "Helmand civilization" was proposed by M. Tosi. This civilization flourished between 2500 BC and 1900 BC and may have coincided with the great flourishing of the Indus Valley civilisation. This was also the final phase of Periods III and IV of Shahr-i Sokhta, and the last part of Mundigak Period IV.

According to Jarrige et al.,

There were also links between Shahr-i Sokhta I, II, and III periods, and Mundigak III and IV periods, and between the sites of Balochistan and the Indus valley at the end of the 4th millennium, as well as in the first half of the 3rd millennium BC.

The Jiroft culture is closely related to the Helmand culture. The Jiroft culture flourished in eastern Iran, and the Helmand culture in western Afghanistan at the same time. They may represent the same cultural area. The Mehrgarh culture, on the other hand, is far earlier.

Achaemenid times

Helmand was inhabited by ancient peoples and governed by the Medes before falling to the Achaemenids.

Later, the area was part of the ancient Arachosia polity, and a frequent target for conquest because of its strategic location in Asia, which connects Southern, Central and Southwest Asia.

The Helmand river valley is mentioned by name in the Avesta (Fargard 1:13) as Haetumant, one of the early centers or origins of the Zoroastrian faith, in pre-Islamic Afghan history. However, owing to the presence of non-Zoroastrians even though Zoroastrians being dominant before the Islamization of Afghanistan – particularly Buddhist.

Some Vedic scholars (e.g. Kochhar 1999) also believe the Helmand river corresponds to the Sarasvati river mentioned in the Rig Veda as the homeland of the Aryan tribes before migrating into the Indian Subcontinent, ca. 1500 BCE.

Alexander the Great to modern times
It was invaded in 330 BC by Alexander the Great and became part of the Seleucid Empire. Later, it came under the rule of the Mauryan emperor Ashoka, who erected a pillar there with a bilingual inscription in Greek and Aramaic. The territory was referred to as part of Zabulistan and ruled by the sun-worshipping Zunbils before the Muslim Arabs arrived in the 7th century, who were led by Abdur Rahman bin Samara. It later fell to the Saffarids of Zaranj and saw the first Muslim rule. Mahmud of Ghazni made it part of the Ghaznavids in the 10th century, who were replaced by the Ghurids.

After the destructions caused by Genghis Khan and his Mongol army in the 13th century, the Timurids established rule and began rebuilding Afghan cities. From about 1383 until his death in 1407, it was governed by Pir Muhammad, a grandson of Timur. By the early 16th century, it fell to Babur. However, the area was often contested by the Shia Safavids and Sunni Mughals until the rise of Mir Wais Hotak in 1709. He defeated the Safavids and established the Hotaki dynasty. The Hotakis ruled it until 1738 when the Afsharids defeated Shah Hussain Hotaki at what is now Old Kandahar.

Durrani era
When Ahmad Shah Durrani came to power in 1747, after Nader Shah was assassinated, he began redistributing land grants that had been given by his predecessor. At that time, the area of what is now Helmand province was part of Kandahar Province (which continued until it was split off into the new Farah Province during the reign of Sher Ali Khan), and it was known as Pusht-e Rud, or "across the river", reflecting how the region was viewed from Kandahar, which was Ahmad Shah's capital. Pusht-e Rud traditionally consisted into four districts: Zamindawar, Now Zad, Pusht-e Rud proper, and Garmsir. Ahmad Shah's land redistribution legitimized existing Alizai influence in Zamindawar, while the powerful Barakzai received Pusht-e Rud proper, and the district of Garmsir in the south was granted to the Noorzai to protect against Baluch raids. Now Zad was divided between the Noorzai and the Ishaqzai. This arrangement has survived, with a few exceptions, until the present day.

Then, as now, relatively few members of the Popolzai tribe (to which Ahmad Shah Durrani belonged) lived in Helmand. The Durrani monarchs were thus ambivalent towards the area's tribes and didn't favor any one tribe over the others. Rather, they treated the tribes according to their relative power. Thus, the powerful Barakzai tribe received a hereditary position as ministers to the crown, as well as some of the most valuable land in Helmand: the alluvial plains around present-day Malgir, Babaji, and Spin Masjid, as well as the strategically important Gereshk.

That changed in 1826, when Dost Mohammad Khan, himself a Barakzai, seized power. Dost Mohammad increased taxes on non-Barakzai tribes in Helmand, especially the Alizai of Zamindawar. When the Alizai didn't pay taxes, a Barakzai punitive expedition was sent to Zamindawar, and in Alizai clan chiefs were executed. During this period, the Alizai began to view the Barakzai as enemies, creating the Alizai-Barakzai dynamic that still heavily influences Helmand politics.

At this time, the area around Garmsir was effectively independent, and ignored by the monarchy in Kabul.

Anglo-Afghan Wars

In 1839, the British deposed Dost Mohammad Khan in favor of the Popolzai Shah Shujah Durrani. In doing so, they hoped to limit Russian influence in Afghanistan. Hoping to secure the loyalty of Helmandi tribal leaders, Shah Shujah reinstated the titles they had previously enjoyed under Popolzai rule, and he also held off on taxing them until his position was stronger. However, he kept the Barakzai tax collectors in office, and they resumed collection in 1840. When a Barakzai tax collector was killed at Sarwan Qala that year, the British sent in troops to enforce collection, a political blunder leading to open rebellion by the Alizai. It is not known if the British were aware of the political ramifications of Shah Shujah's decision to retain the Barakzai tax collectors, but they were completely bewildered by the ensuing rebellion, reflecting a clear lack of understanding of local dynamics on their part.

The leader of the rebellion was Aktur Khan, who had risen to prominence during this dispute. His invocations of Alizai honor and appeals to group identity had resulted in him attaining chieftainship of the Alizai. After some skirmishes, the British offered to remove the Barakzai tax collectors in return for the dispersal of Aktur Khan's 1,300 followers. This soon broke down, and by May 1841, Aktur Khan led a force of 3,000 men to capture Gereshk. The British retook Gereshk at the beginning of June and then led punitive expeditions into Zamindawar, and eventually the rebellion was defeated and Aktur Khan fled to Herat.

British-backed Barakzai horsemen were sent to reinforce Gereshk in November 1841. The Alizai repeatedly tried to capture it, but the Barakzai were able to maintain control until August 1842 because the other Barakzai who lived there kept them well-supplied.

Dost Mohammad Khan was reinstalled for a second reign when the British withdrew from Afghanistan, but he ran into financial difficulties and sought a subsidy from the British in 1857. He distributed money from this subsidy unevenly among Helmandi tribes, favoring the Barakzai over the others, which upset the balance of power between the tribes. The subsidy also divided Afghanistan into British and Russian spheres of influence, with Gereshk and the Helmand river being on the border between them, increasing the area's strategic importance. The subsidy ended in 1862 when Dost Mohammad died and a succession crisis broke out between his sons. Helmandis fought as mercenaries on the side of one of them, Sher Ali Khan, playing a role in his eventual victory. The deciding battle was fought at Gereshk in 1868.

Indebted to the Helmandi tribes for their contributions during the war, Sher Ali scaled back tax collection in the area and reduced the allowances to the Barakzai khans. Because of this, the Alizai did not rebel during his reign. Another key development for Helmand (Pusht-e Rud) during Sher Ali's reign was that he moved its four traditional districts into the newly created Farah Province, moving it out of Kandahar's sphere of influence and meaning that he could influence the Pusht-e Rud area without going through a relative in Kandahar.

In November 1878, the British invaded Afghanistan again. They occupied Gereshk until February 1879; an Alizai force of 1500 attacked them as they withdrew. Sher Ali died soon after, however, and the British wanted to again occupy Gereshk as a forward outpost against Sher Ali's son Ayub Khan. Perhaps realizing that the presence of their troops garrisoning Helmandi forts upset locals, the British sent a proxy Barakzai force to occupy Gereshk.

Ayub Khan found ample support from Helmandis in his subsequent campaign against the British: three or four thousand Alizai tribesmen, led by a man named Abu Bakr, had joined his army by October, as did a smaller contingent of Noorzai. Doubting the Barakzai's loyalty, the British sent some of their own troops to reinforce Gereshk in July 1880, led by George Burrows. The Barakzai promptly mutinied and went over to Ayub Khan's side — a rare Barakzai-Alizai alliance, joining against a common enemy. The British withdrew and Ayub Khan's army pursued, leading to a major Afghan victory at the Battle of Maiwand on 27 July. Having achieved their main goal of defeating the British, the Alizai then left and returned to Zamindawar.

The British later defeated Ayub Khan, but they ended up withdrawing from Afghanistan altogether, installing Abdur Rahman Khan as the new ruler and giving him a subsidy. Abdur Rahman Khan was a strong and intelligent state-builder who used the subsidy to finance a professional army. He defeated Abu Bakr of the Alizai and had him exiled, after which the Alizai cooperated with paying taxes. He used a combination of incentives and force to move the Ishaqzai and Noorzai to the northwestern part of Afghanistan, away from the lands along the Helmand they had been granted by Nader Shah. Their relocation was a disaster and many ended up returning to the Helmand area.

When they came back, however, they were only given scattered, less-productive lands. This dramatically changed the power dynamic of the Helmand area, marking the beginning of Ishaqzai and (to a lesser degree) Noorzai disenfranchisement from government that has continued into the 21st century. The Noorzai would occupy marginal lands until the late 20th century, and the Ishaqzai population remains dispersed and scattered throughout Helmand today.

The weakening of Helmand's non-Barakzai tribes, combined with a policy of non-interference with the tribes, led to stability in the region throughout Abdur Rahman's reign. This continued during the rule of his son Habibullah, who died in 1919.

20th century development projects
An important development was the re-construction of the Nahr-e Saraj canal, beginning in 1910. Newly irrigated areas that had previously been desert were now populated with ethnic and tribal groups who were not originally from Helmand, including refugees from Central Asia fleeing Soviet rule. Many of the villages along the canal therefore are named after these groups, such as Uzbek, Turkmen, and Popolzai. The government had originally planned to continue developing the Helmand area during the 1920s, but ended up shelving that project due to unrest over Amanullah's social reforms. In 1936, after the Musahiban dynasty had come to power, the government began construction of another canal in Helmand, the Nahr-e Bughra. The Afghan government originally sought out US financial and technical assistance, but the US refused, so instead it was the Germans and Japanese who contributed. The Nahr-e Bughra project employed up to 7,000 workers, and there were also other small-scale development projects in the area at the same time. Roads, bridges, and telephone wires were built to connect the major settlements. This was the first externally supervised development project in Helmand. However, when World War II broke out, the British requested that the German and Japanese engineers be expelled from Afghanistan, and the government had to continue on its own.

Helmand was the center of the USAID program in the 1960s to develop the Helmand and Arghandab Valley Authority (HAVA) – it became known locally as "little America". The program laid out tree-lined streets in Lashkargah, built a network of irrigation canals and constructed a large hydroelectric dam. The development program was abandoned when pro-Soviet Union forces seized power in 1978, although much of the province is still irrigated by the HAVA.

Administrative changes
Thanks in part to the irrigation projects, the Pusht-e Rud area had become more important, and the government recognized this by splitting it off from Farah Province to create a new Gereshk Province in 1960. Gereshk was made the capital to reflect the historical importance of the Barakzai, which had been diluted by the influx of outside settlers in the province. The US, however, cared more that the HVA headquarters was in Lashkar Gah, and they successfully lobbied the Afghan government to relocate the provincial capital there. This happened in 1964, and the province was renamed "Helmand Province".

For the first time since 1826, the Helmandi Barakzai were no longer dominant in the region. To compensate for this, the government completelty redrew the district boundaries in Helmand. The four traditional districts were abolished and replaced new districts. These new districts, greater in number than the traditional ones, were each assigned an "order", which determined how much resources would be allocated to each district. Additionally, since the 1964 constitution introduced voting, the new districts were drawn in a way allowing the government to maintain influence and control.

The former Barakzai-dominated district of Pusht-e Rud proper, or Gereshk, was split into Nahr-e Seraj (the only 1st order district in the province), Nawa (4th order), and Lashkar Gah (which, as the capital, had its own resourcing protocol). Lashkar Gah district was gerrymandered to give the Barakzai a majority over the mixed tribes in the urban area: a slice of Barakzai-dominated Babaji was included, and the boundary with Nad-e Ali district was drawn on the border of Barakzai territory in Bolan. This way, the Barakzai central government was able to retain control of even the new capital of Helmand.

Meanwhile, the Alizai district of Zamindawar was split into Musa Qala (2nd order), Baghran (4th order), and Kajaki (sub-district status). Now Zad, with its mixed Noorzai and Ishaqzai population, was split into Now Zad (2nd order) and Washir (sub-district status). Garmsir district was the only one of the traditional districts to remain intact; it was given 3rd-order status. The 37 different tribes and ethnicities who had immigrated to Nad-e Ali and Marjah were lumped into a single 3rd-order district. Finally, the sub-district of Sangin was created to separate the Alikozai tribe, closely related to the Barakzai, from the Alizai.

21st century

During Operation Enduring Freedom, the United States Agency for International Development program contributed to a counter-narcotics initiative called the Alternative Livelihoods Program (ALP) in the province. It paid communities to work to improve their environment and economic infrastructure as an alternative to opium poppy farming. The project undertook drainage and canal rehabilitation projects. In 2005 and 2006, there were problems in getting promised finance to communities and this was a source of considerable tension between the farmers and the Coalition forces.

After it was decided to deploy British troops to the Province, PJHQ tasked 22 SAS to conduct a reconnaissance of the province. The review was led by Mark Carleton-Smith, who found the province largely at peace due to the brutal rule of Sher Mohammad Akhundzada, and a booming opium-fuelled economy that benefited the pro-government warlords. In June he reported back to the MoD warning them not to remove Akhundzada and against the deployment of a large British force which would likely cause conflict where none existed.

It was announced in January 2006 in the British Parliament that International Security Assistance Force (ISAF) would replace the U.S. troops in the province as part of Operation Herrick. The British 16 Air Assault Brigade would be the core of the force in Helmand Province. British bases were located in the districts of Sangin, Lashkargah and Grishk. British forces were replaced in Sangin by elements of the United States Marine Corps I Marine Expeditionary Force Forward.

In summer 2006, Helmand was one of the provinces involved in Operation Mountain Thrust, a combined NATO-Afghan mission targeted at Taliban fighters in the south of the country. In July 2006, this offensive mission essentially stalled in Helmand as NATO, primarily British, and Afghan troops were forced to take increasingly defensive positions under heavy insurgent pressure. In response, British troop levels in the province were increased, and new encampments were established in Sangin and Grishk. Fighting was particularly heavy in the districts of Sangin, Naway, Nawzad and Garmsir. There were reports that the Taliban saw Helmand province as a key testing area for their ability to take and hold Afghan territory from NATO-led Afghan National Security Forces. Commanders on the ground described the situation as the most brutal conflict the British Army had been involved in since the Korean War.

In Autumn 2006, British troops started to reach "cessation of hostilities" agreements with local Taliban forces around the district centers where they had been stationed earlier in the summer. Under the terms of the agreement, both sets of forces were to withdraw from the conflict zone. This agreement from the British forces implied that the strategy of holding key bases in the district, as requested by Afghan President Hamid Karzai, was essentially untenable with the levels of British troop deployment. The agreement was also a setback for Taliban fighters, who were desperate to consolidate their gains in the province, but were under heavy pressure from various NATO offensives.

News reports identified the insurgents involved in the fighting as a mix of Taliban fighters and warring tribal groups who are heavily involved in the province's lucrative opium trade. Given the amount of drugs produced in the area, it is likely that foreign drug traffickers were also involved.

Fighting continued throughout the winter, with British and allied troops taking a more pro-active stance against the Taliban insurgents. Several operations were launched including Operation Silicone at the start of spring. In May 2007, Mullah Dadullah, one of the Taliban's top commanders, along with 11 of his men were killed by NATO-led Afghan forces in Helmand.

The operation was to set up forward operation bases and train the Afghan National Police in an area with little or no outside support.

Also in 2008, an Embedded Training Team from the Oregon Army National Guard led a Kandak of Afghan National Army troops in fighting against the Taliban in Lashkargah, as seen in the documentary Shepherds of Helmand.

In June 2009, Operation Panther's Claw was launched with the stated aim of securing control of various canal and river crossings and establishing a lasting ISAF presence in an area described by Lt. Col. Richardson as "one of the main Taliban strongholds" ahead of the 2009 Afghan presidential election.

In July 2009, around 4,000 U.S. Marines pushed into the Helmand River valley in a major offensive to liberate the area from Taliban insurgents. The operation, dubbed Operation Khanjar (Operation Dagger), was the first major push since U.S. President Obama's request for 21,000 additional soldiers in Afghanistan, targeting the Taliban insurgents.

In February 2013, BBC reported that corruption occurs in Afghan National Police bases, with some bases arming children, using them as servants and sometimes sexually abusing them; in early March 2013, the New York Times reported that government corruption is rampant with routine accusations against the police of shaking down and sexually abusing civilians causing loyalty to the government to be weaker.

On 13 August 2021, the capital of the province Lashkar Gah fell to the Taliban after weeks of fighting in the Battle of Lashkargah. Around 1,500 Afghan soldiers were said to have surrendered, leaving the province in Taliban hands. According to The Washington Post, the US withdrawal and Taliban victory was mostly met with relief in Helmand; the province had suffered through some of the deadliest battles of the war from 2001 to 2021 and heavy US-led bombardments.

Transport

Bost Airport serves the population of Helmand for domestic flights to other parts of the country. It is designed for civilian use. NATO-led forces heavily used the airport at Camp Shorabak, formerly Camp Bastion. Camp Leatherneck, which used to be the main British base in Afghanistan during the occupation, is also adjacent. All sites were claimed by the Taliban on 13 August 2021.

There is no rail service. Primary roads include the ring road passes through Helmand from Kandahar to Delaram. There is a major north–south route (Highway 611) that goes from Lashkargah to Sangin. About 33% of Helmands roads are not passable during certain seasons and in some areas, there are no roads at all.

Economy

Farming is the main source of income for the majority. This includes agriculture and animal husbandry. Animals include cows, sheep, goats, and chicken. Donkeys and camels are used for labor. The province has a potential for fishery. The region produce the following: opium, tobacco, cotton, wheat and potato.

Healthcare

The percentage of households with clean drinking water fell from 28% in 2005 to 3% in 2011.
The percentage of births attended to by a skilled birth attendant increased from 2% in 2005 to 3% in 2011.

Education

The overall literacy rate (6+ years of age) increased from 5% in 2005 to 12% in 2011.
The overall net enrollment rate (6–13 years of age) fell from 6% in 2005 to 4% in 2011.

Demographics

As of 2020, the population of Helmand Province is about 1,446,230. It is mostly a tribal and rural society, with the ethnic Pashtuns being predominant; there is a significant Baloch minority in the south, and there is small minority of Tajiks, and a significant minority of Hazaras in the far northern regions of the province. The Pashtuns are divided into the following tribes: Barakzai (32%), Nurzai (16%), Alakozai (9%), and Eshaqzai (5.2%). All the inhabitants practice Sunni Islam except the small number of Hazaras who are Shi'as and the Sikhs who follow Sikhism. 53.5% of the population lived below the national poverty line.

Districts

Politicians
Mohammad Daoud

See also
Provinces of Afghanistan
2007 Helmand province airstrikes
Dashti Margo
Operation Khanjar

Gallery

References

External links

 
Provinces of Afghanistan
Provinces of the Islamic Republic of Afghanistan